Telefe Santa Fe (call sign LT 82 TV) is an Argentine broadcast television station on channel 13 owned by Telefe in Santa Fe, Argentina. The channel covers central and northwestern Santa Fe Province. It is operated by Paramount Global through the Telefe Group.

Local programming

Notitrece - news
Sembrando ("Seeding") - country news
Martín Bustamante - country news
Nuestra Casa ("Our Home") - DIY and cooking
Otra Visión ("Another View") - health advice
Pausa en Familia ("Family Break") - religious

External links 
 
 Telefe Interior

Television stations in Argentina
Television channels and stations established in 1966
Telefe